Elman Tagaýew (born June 2, 1989 in Kyzyl-Arvat) is a Turkmen professional football midfielder of Azerbaijani descent, who last played for FC Ahal.

Biography
Tagaýew was born in Ashgabat, Turkmenistan to an Azerbaijani family. He began playing football at eight years old. In 2014, he married his wife Arina. In 2015, they had two twin sons named Alan and Ali.

Career

Club
Tagaýew started his career at Aşgabat before going on trial with Khazar Lankaran in early 2012. During his trial with Khazar Lankaran he appeared as a substitute, and scored, against Turkmenistan. Khazar declined to sign Tagaýew due to the players attitude during a game. Tagaýew went on to sign for AZAL in the summer of 2012, but only made 8 appearances before leaving in March 2013.

In June 2017, Tagayev signed a one-year contract with newly-promoted Azerbaijan Premier League team Səbail FK. Tagayev was released by Sabail FK at the end of the 2017–18 season.

International
Elman Tagaýew played for the Turkmenistan national under-23 football team at the 2010 Asian Games in Guangzhou. 

Tagaýew's first international goal came against Nepal in the 2012 AFC Challenge Cup group stage. As part of the national team of Turkmenistan, he became the finalist of the 2012 AFC Challenge Cup.

Career statistics

Club

International

Statistics accurate as of match played 26 March 2017

International goals

Honours

International
AFC Challenge Cup
Runners-up: 2012

Individual
 Football Federation of Turkmenistan Footballer of the Year: 2021 
Ýokary Liga Top Goalscorer: 2021 (10 goals)

References

External links

1989 births
Living people
Turkmenistan footballers
Turkmenistan international footballers
Association football forwards
Footballers at the 2010 Asian Games
Asian Games competitors for Turkmenistan
FC Aşgabat players
AZAL PFK players
FK Andijon players
Sabail FK players
Azerbaijan Premier League players
Navbahor Namangan players
Uzbekistan Super League players
FC Ahal players
FC Altyn Asyr players